In geometry, the nonconvex great rhombicuboctahedron is a nonconvex uniform polyhedron, indexed as U17. It has 26 faces (8 triangles and 18 squares), 48 edges, and 24 vertices. Its vertex figure is a crossed quadrilateral.

This model shares the name with the convex great rhombicuboctahedron, also called the truncated cuboctahedron.

An alternative name for this figure is quasirhombicuboctahedron. From that derives its Bowers acronym: querco.

Orthogonal projections

Cartesian coordinates 
Cartesian coordinates for the vertices of a nonconvex great rhombicuboctahedron centered at the origin with edge length 1 are all the permutations of

 (±ξ, ±1, ±1),

where ξ =  − 1.

Related polyhedra 

It shares the vertex arrangement with the convex truncated cube. It additionally shares its edge arrangement with the great cubicuboctahedron (having the triangular faces and 6 square faces in common), and with the great rhombihexahedron (having 12 square faces in common). It has the same vertex figure as the pseudo great rhombicuboctahedron, which is not a uniform polyhedron.

Great deltoidal icositetrahedron

The great deltoidal icositetrahedron is the dual of the nonconvex great rhombicuboctahedron.

References

External links 

 
 Great Rhombicuboctahedron Paper model

Uniform polyhedra